Modern (styled as ".Nowoczesna") is a centrist political party in Poland. It is currently led by Adam Szłapka.

It was formed in 2015 as "ModernPL" although due to controversy it had to change the name to ".Modern" later that year. Its first president Ryszard Petru served until 2017, when he was succeeded by Katarzyna Lubnauer. It first gained seats in the 2015 parliamentary election, and in 2018 it joined the Civic Coalition to participate together in the local elections. Szłapka was elected as president in 2019. Modern is a member of the Alliance of Liberals and Democrats for Europe, and it is orientated towards the principles of liberalism, and classical liberalism. It also supports Poland's membership in the European Union.

History
The party was founded in late May 2015 as NowoczesnaPL (ModernPL) by economist Ryszard Petru. The founding convention was held on 31 May 2015 at which around 6,000 people gathered to participate. The chairman presented the program of the party, and besides him, other activists spoke during the convention. Due to some controversy over its name – there had already been a non-governmental organization called the Modern Poland Foundation, In August 2015, the party's name was changed to .Modern (.Nowoczesna). Around the same time, the party's new logo was presented, and Kamila Gasiuk-Pihowicz became its spokesperson. The party received 7.6% of votes in the 2015 parliamentary election, which resulted in winning 28 seats in the Sejm.

The party was admitted into the Alliance of Liberals and Democrats for Europe (ALDE) on 4 June 2016. From 2015 election to end of 2016 Nowoczesna had more support in polls than Platforma Obywatelska. It has lost it after image problems of Ryszard Petru. Katarzyna Lubnauer became the leader of Nowoczesna in November 2017. In leader elections at the party congress, Lubnauer received 149 votes and Petru received 140 votes.

In March 2018, Modern and Civic Platform formed the Civic Coalition electoral alliance to contest the 2018 local elections. In May 2018, founder Ryszard Petru left the party. In 2019, Modern was running for the European Parliament as part of the European Coalition. In June 2019, Modern joined the Civic Platform - Civic Coalition parliamentary group. During the 2019 Polish parliamentary elections the party was a member of the Civic Coalition along with the Civic Platform, Polish Initiative and the Greens. After these elections, Modern rejoined the Civic Coalition parliamentary group, and Adam Szłapka was elected as president of the party.

Ideology
The party has been compared to the Free Democratic Party of Germany (FDP), with its emphasis on economic liberalism in its policy platform. With their new party programme released in 2021, the party significantly changed its economical course to a more left-wing economical stance, while still maintaining its progressive social nature. This may be caused by the participation in Civic Coalition (it contains other left-wing parties like the Polish Initiative and Greens).

Leadership

Party Leaders

Parliamentary Leaders

Since 13 June 2019 members of Modern are part of the Civic Coalition parliamentary group.

Election results

Sejm

Senate

Regional assemblies

European Parliament

References

External links

2015 establishments in Poland
Centrist parties in Poland
Civic Coalition (Poland)
Classical liberal parties
Liberal parties in Poland
Political parties established in 2015
Political parties in Poland
Pro-European political parties in Poland